Bass on Top is the third studio album by American jazz bassist Paul Chambers recorded in 1957 and released on the Blue Note label in October 1957. It features Chambers in a quartet with guitarist Kenny Burrell, pianist Hank Jones and drummer Art Taylor.

Reception
The Allmusic review by Stephen Thomas Erlewine stated: "The result is a warm, entertaining collection of mainstream jazz that nevertheless rewards close listening".

Track listing
 "Yesterdays" (Otto Harbach, Jerome Kern) - 5:53
 "You'd Be So Nice to Come Home To" (Cole Porter) - 7:16
 "Chasin' the Bird" (Charlie Parker) - 6:18
 "Dear Old Stockholm" (Traditional) - 6:44
 "The Theme" (Miles Davis) - 6:15
 "Confessin'" (Doc Daugherty, Ellis Reynolds, Al Neiburg) - 4:13
 "Chamber Mates" (Kenny Burrell, Paul Chambers) - 5:08

Personnel
Paul Chambers - bass
Hank Jones - piano
Kenny Burrell - guitar
Art Taylor - drums

References

Blue Note Records albums
Paul Chambers albums
1957 albums
Albums produced by Alfred Lion
Albums recorded at Van Gelder Studio